Harmonyville is the name of some places in the United States:

 Harmonyville, Pennsylvania
 Harmonyville, Vermont